Ruth Forman is an American poet. Her content focuses on spirituality, love, challenge, and grace. She currently travels around the United States performing readings from her recent publication; Prayers Like Shoes, and her children's book; Young Cornrows Calling Out the Moon.

Life
She graduated from University of California, Berkeley, and University of Southern California film school.

She lives in Washington DC.

Awards
 2001 Durfee Artist Fellowship to continue work on Mama John, her first novel
 1999 Pen Oakland Josephine Miles Award for Poetry.
 1992 Barnard Women Poets Prize

Works

Poetry
 "Poetry Should Ride the Bus", David Knecht

Juvenile

Anthologies

References

External links
 "Poet Ruth Forman Reads from 'Callin out the Moon'", NPR

Year of birth missing (living people)
Living people
University of California, Berkeley alumni
USC School of Cinematic Arts alumni
American women poets
PEN Oakland/Josephine Miles Literary Award winners
21st-century American women